Jeffrey Albert Tucker (born December 19, 1963) is an American libertarian writer, publisher, entrepreneur and advocate of anarcho-capitalism and Bitcoin.

For many years he worked for Ron Paul, the Mises Institute, and Lew Rockwell. With the American Institute for Economic Research (AIER) he organized efforts against COVID-19 restrictions starting in 2020, and he founded the Brownstone Institute think tank in 2021 to continue such efforts.

As of 2021, he is Chief Liberty Officer (CLO) of Liberty.me. He is an adjunct scholar with the Mackinac Center for Public Policy, a research affiliate of RMIT University's Blockchain Innovation Hub, and an Acton Institute associate.

Early life and education
A son of the Texas historian Albert Briggs Tucker and Roberta Janeice (Robertson) Tucker, Jeffrey Albert Tucker was born in Fresno, California, in 1963.

He studied economics as an undergraduate at Texas Tech University and Howard Payne University, where he first encountered the literature of the Austrian School. He later enrolled as a graduate student in economics at George Mason University.

Career

Writer and editor
While studying at George Mason, Tucker attended a journalism program in Washington, D.C., where he became a volunteer at the Washington office of the Mises Institute.

In the late 1980s, he worked for Ron Paul as an assistant to editor Lew Rockwell. During Paul's 2008 Presidential campaign, newsletters written on behalf of Paul became controversial because some contained statements against black people and gay people. Tucker was said to have helped Rockwell write the newsletters.

From 1997 to 2011, Tucker worked for the Mises Institute, of which Rockwell was a co-founder, as editorial vice president and editor for the institute's website, Mises.org. From 1999 to 2011 he contributed to LewRockwell.com.

According to a 2000 report by the Southern Poverty Law Center (SPLC), Tucker wrote for publications of the League of the South, a group the SPLC considers neo-Confederate and white supremacist. The SPLC report said Tucker was listed as a founding member on the league's website, but that Tucker denied being a member.

In late 2011, Tucker was hired by Addison Wiggin as publisher and executive editor of Laissez Faire Books, and worked in that capacity until 2016. As of 2017, he remains a contributor to LFB.

Tucker was appointed a Distinguished Fellow of the Foundation for Economic Education in 2013, speaking at FEE's seminars and writing for its publication The Freeman.  From 2015 to 2017, he was FEE's Director of Content.

Tucker became Editorial Director of the American Institute for Economic Research (AIER) in late 2017. As of 2021, he is listed as an independent editorial consultant at AIER.

Bitcoin advocacy
In 2013, Tucker wrote a primer about the cryptocurrency Bitcoin called "Bitcoin for Beginners", in which he described it as solving the problems of double spending and single point of failure. He has been interviewed on the subject by Reason at the 2013 Freedom Fest and Fox Business Channel. Tucker's 2015 book Bit by Bit is devoted to Bitcoin and other products of the "information economy". In 2018 he became a research affiliate of the Blockchain Innovation Hub, a study center at RMIT University.

In 2018, Tucker endorsed Liberland, a micronation claimed on a disputed sandbank between Croatia and Serbia that accepts the cryptocurrencies Bitcoin, Bitcoin Cash, and Ethereum.

Speaker
Tucker has appeared as a speaker at conferences on Austrian school economics, and libertarianism
including FreedomFest conferences, events of the Free State Project, and the 2016 and 2018 Libertarian Party national convention.

Social media
In 2013, Tucker founded and became the CEO (under the title "Chief Liberty Officer") of Liberty.me, a "social network and online publishing platform for the liberty minded", which launched a successful Indiegogo fundraising campaign in 2013 and began operation in 2014.

COVID-19 pandemic and Brownstone Institute 
Tucker blogged in opposition to social distancing measures and face masks during the COVID-19 pandemic, framing them as subservience to "arbitrary and ignorant authority".

In 2020, Tucker helped organize the Great Barrington Declaration, signed at AIER, which advocated the lifting of COVID-19 restrictions.

In 2021, Tucker founded the nonprofit Brownstone Institute for Social and Economic Research, a think tank that opposes various measures against COVID-19, including masking and vaccine mandates. Senior roles were given to Martin Kulldorff and Jay Bhattacharya, two of the co-authors of the Great Barrington Declaration, which Tucker also helped to organize. The institute has described itself as "the spiritual child" of the Great Barrington Declaration. Writers of Brownstone articles have included Sunetra Gupta, the third co-author of the Great Barrington Declaration, Paul E. Alexander, a former Trump administration health official, and George Gilder, a senior resident fellow at AIER. Science-Based Medicine has described the Brownstone Institute as spreading misinformation against vaccines and in favor of disproven treatments.

Views
Tucker has referred to war as an "alluring illusion" and has been critical of American interventionist foreign policy.

In an interview for California Sunday, Tucker described his "vision of freedom" by recalling a view over São Paulo by night: "As far as my eyes could see, there were lights and buildings and civilization burgeoning — an awesome amount of human knowledge, energy, innovation, creative capacity right in front of me. I began to turn, and it was true over here, and over there, and in every single direction, and I thought, That’s it! This world will never be governed. It cannot be governed. It was beautiful."

Personal life
Formerly a Southern Baptist, Tucker is a convert to traditionalist Catholicism. He was managing editor of the Church Music Association of America journal Sacred Music from 2006 to 2014. From 2013 to 2015, he edited CMAA's website New Liturgical Movement.

Published works

Books in English
 Henry Hazlitt: Giant For Liberty (with Llewellyn H. Rockwell and Murray N. Rothbard, 1994, Ludwig von Mises Institute): an annotated bibliography of the works of Henry Hazlitt. A Foundation for Economic Education review described the book, which "includes citations of a novel, works on literary criticism, treatises on economics and moral philosophy, several edited volumes, some 16 other books and many chapters in books, plus articles, commentaries, and reviews," as "an apt eulogy of Henry Hazlitt."
 Sing Like a Catholic (2009, Church Music Association of America): essays on church music
 Bourbon for Breakfast: Living Outside the Statist Quo (2010, Ludwig von Mises Institute)
 It's a Jetsons World: Private Miracles and Public Crimes (2011, Ludwig von Mises Institute)
 Hack Your Shower Head: and 10 Other Ways to Get Big Government out of Your Home (2012, Laissez Faire Books)
 A Beautiful Anarchy: How to Create Your Own Civilization in the Digital Age (2012, Laissez Faire Books): on the effects of small business regulation
 Liberty.me: Freedom Is a Do-It-Yourself Project (2014, Liberty.me)
 Bit by Bit: How P2P is Freeing the World (2015, e-book)
 Advice for Young, Unemployed Workers (2015, pamphlet, Foundation for Economic Education)
 Right-Wing Collectivism: The Other Threat to Liberty (2017): Addresses that the threat of collectivism comes from the right as well as the far left
 Liberty or Lockdown (2020): Discusses the choice between liberty and COVID-19 lockdowns

In translation
Four of Tucker's books have been published in Spanish translations, including the following:
 Milagros del sector privado y crímenes del sector público (2014)
 Una bella anarquía (2014)

In periodicals
He has written for, among others, Journal of Libertarian Studies, The Wall Street Journal, The Journal of Commerce, National Review, The Freeman, Catholic World Report, Crisis, Sacred Music, Newsweek, and Chronicles.

See also

References

External links

 Jeffrey Tucker at WorldCat
 Columns at Newsweek
 Books by Jeffrey Tucker (in e-book format) 
 Essays at LewRockwell.com
 Columns in Crisis magazine
 Appearances on C-SPAN
 Brownstone Institute home page

1963 births
Living people
20th-century American male writers
20th-century American non-fiction writers
20th-century Baptists
21st-century American essayists
21st-century American male writers
21st-century American non-fiction writers
21st-century Roman Catholics
American anarcho-capitalists
American book editors
American columnists
American libertarians
American male non-fiction writers
American political writers
American traditionalist Catholics
Catholics from California
Catholics from Georgia (U.S. state)
Catholic libertarians
Converts to Roman Catholicism from Baptist denominations
Libertarian theorists
Mises Institute people
National Review people
Newsweek people
Non-interventionism
People associated with Bitcoin
People from Atlanta
People from Fresno, California
The Wall Street Journal people
Writers from Atlanta
Writers from California